The 1952–53 Indiana Hoosiers men's basketball team represented Indiana University. Their head coach was Branch McCracken, who was in his 12th year.  A member of the Big Ten Conference, they played home games on campus in The Fieldhouse in Bloomington, Indiana.

The Hoosiers finished the regular season with an overall record of 23–3 and a conference record of 17–1, first in the standings. As Big Ten champion, Indiana was invited the 22-team NCAA tournament, and advanced to the championship game in Kansas City. IU beat defending champion Kansas by a point for their second national title.

Roster

Schedule/Results

|-
!colspan=6 style=| Regular Season
|-

|-
!colspan=6 style=| NCAA tournament

Rankings

NBA draft

References

Indiana Hoosiers
Indiana Hoosiers men's basketball seasons
NCAA Division I men's basketball tournament championship seasons
NCAA Division I men's basketball tournament Final Four seasons
Indiana
1952 in sports in Indiana
1953 in sports in Indiana